Harpalus autumnalis is a species of ground beetle in the subfamily Harpalinae. It was described by Duftschmid in 1812.

References

autumnalis
Beetles described in 1812